Marquita Moseley Maytag (December 4, 1925 – February 15, 2011) was an American heiress who briefly served as the United States ambassador to Nepal from 1976 to 1977.

Early life and education 
Maytag was born in Los Angeles in 1925. The heiress to the Maytag fortune, she was raised in Hawaii and Sun Valley, Idaho. She attended the University of California, Los Angeles.

Career 
An influential political operative in California and Idaho, Maytag was a member of the board of directors of the American Conservative Union from 1969 to 1972. She was also the director of the Grand Central Industrial Center and Regency Galleries in Los Angeles. Maytag was instrumental in switching Idaho delegates from Ronald Reagan to Gerald Ford at the 1976 Republican National Convention. After Ford assumed office as president, Maytag was nominated to serve as United States ambassador to Nepal. During her tenure, Maytag became known for odd behavior.

References 

Ambassadors of the United States to Nepal
1925 births
2011 deaths
Maytag family

People from Sun Valley, Idaho
People from Hailey, Idaho
University of California, Los Angeles alumni
Ford administration personnel